Donuca rubropicta is a species of moth of the family Noctuidae first described by Arthur Gardiner Butler in 1874. It is found in Australia in south-eastern Queensland and north-east New South Wales.

The wingspan is about 50 mm.

References

Catocalina